Dillinger Four (sometimes abbreviated as D4) is an American punk rock band formed in 1994 in Minneapolis, Minnesota. They have released four full-length studio albums. Since 1996, the band's lineup has been Patrick Costello on bass guitar and vocals, Erik Funk and Bill  on guitars and vocals, and Lane Pederson on drums.

History 
Dillinger Four was formed in 1994 by guitarist Erik Funk and bassist Patrick Costello. The two had previously played together in the Chicago-based hardcore band Angerhouse.

The original lineup, which also included guitarist Sloan Lorsung and drummer Lane Pedersen, released the 1995 debut 7" single Higher Aspirations: Tempered and Dismantled. Lorsung was replaced by Bill Morrisette before the 1996 follow-up EP The Kids Are All Dead. A series of subsequent singles and compilation appearances were later collected on 1999's This Shit is Genius. In June 1998, Dillinger Four joined As Friends Rust and Discount on a leg of their American tour.

The band was signed to California hardcore label Hopeless Records on the strength of what Hopeless founder Louis Posen called its "international following." The label released Dillinger Four's first two full-length records, 1998's Midwestern Songs of the Americas and 2000's Versus God. The band moved to Fat Wreck Chords for 2002's Situationist Comedy and 2008's Civil War.

Funk founded and co-owned the influential Minneapolis music venue Triple Rock Social Club, which opened in 1998 and closed in 2017. Dillinger Four played the venue's final concert in November 2017.

Dillinger Four has been honored with a star on the outside mural of the Minneapolis nightclub First Avenue, recognizing performers that have played sold-out shows or have otherwise demonstrated a major contribution to the culture at the iconic venue.

Discography

Studio albums 
 Midwestern Songs of the Americas (Hopeless Records, 1998)
 Versus God (Hopeless Records, 2000)
 Situationist Comedy (Fat Wreck Chords, 2002)
 Civil War (Fat Wreck Chords, 2008)

Live albums 
 Live at First Avenue (2003)
 The End. Live At The Death Of The Triple Rock (2020)

Compilation albums 
 This Shit Is Genius (No Idea Records, 1999)

EPs 
 Higher Aspirations: Tempered and Dismantled (Cerebellum Records, 1995)
 The Kids Are All Dead (Cerebellum Records, 1996)
 More Songs About Girlfriends and Bubblegum (Mutant Pop Records, 1997)
 D4! The Bootleg (Chadwick Records, 2010)

Split releases 
 The Rebel's Choice (split with The Strike) (THD Records, 1997)
 Dillinger Four / Pinhead Gunpowder (Adeline Records, 2000)
 Masters of War (credited as "Dylanger Four") with Brother Mark Treehouse and Atmosphere (2004)

Compilation appearances 
 "Farts are Jazz to Assholes" on Short Music for Short People (1999)
 "Our Science is Tight" and "Maximum Piss and Vinegar" on Hopelessly Devoted to You Vol. 3 (2000)
 "Like Sprewells on a Wheelchair" on Rock Against Bush, Vol. 2 (2004)

Videography 
 Belt Fighting the Man (with Toys That Kill and Rivethead)
 Plea for Peace/Take Action Vol. 2

References 

Fat Wreck Chords artists
Musical groups from Minnesota
American punk rock groups
Hopeless Records artists
Punk rock groups from Minnesota
American melodic hardcore musical groups
Hardcore punk groups from Minnesota